The Flotrack Beer Mile World Championship was an annual beer mile competition that took place in Austin, Texas between 2014 and 2016 that was sponsored by Flotrack, a running-focused media company.

On December 1, 2015 at the second annual World Championship, Canadian Lewis Kent set a new world record with a time of 4:47.17.

The course used at the 2015 race is considered illegal due to a short, inaccurately measured course, and a chug zone that was twice the legal limit at nearly 20 meters. The long chug zone allowed athletes to cover more ground walking through the zone. This error effectively shortened the races, and the long chug zone made at least a 5-second difference.  In 2016, an accurate course measurement resulted in slower times by all athletes. When accurately measured, the 2015 course is considered to be 10-12 faster than the accurately measured 2016 course.

The third annual World Championship was be held on December 17, 2016. Flotrack cancelled the event in 2017, citing internal budget concerns.

Race Details
The event took place annually in Downtown Austin at the Austin American Statesman headquarters.  Originally scheduled for Yellow Jacket Stadium in Austin, community leaders grew concerned (it is a high school football stadium), and the venue for the first race was moved to Circuit of the Americas, where a makeshift quarter mile oval on the pit straight was formed for the inaugural race.  Since the 2015 race, the event has been held in Downtown Austin.

The event is broken down into several different fields. The men's and women's elite fields feature some of the top beer milers in the world. There is also a semi-elite field. Both the elite fields and semi-elite fields require qualification times to enter. There are also open fields open to the first 300 entrants.

The event typically draws crowds in the thousands.

The winner of the men's and women's elite fields receives $5,000.

History
The first Beer Mile World Championship took place on December 3, 2014. Canadian Corey Gallagher took home the crown in the men's elite division with a time of 5:00.2. In the women's field, American Elizabeth Herndon won with a time of 6:17, breaking the former world record by 25 seconds.

The 2015 race featured a loaded field including defending champion Corey Gallagher, Lewis Kent and Jim Finlayson. In an epic race, Kent narrowly edged Gallagher by 2 seconds. Both men broke the previous world record. In the women's field, American Erin O'Mara lowered the women's world record to 6:07. However, these world records were never ratified as the track was short and the chug zone was not standardized. Times in 2016 were slower, as these inaccuracies were fixed.

Winners

Men

Women

External links
 Official Website

References

Annual sporting events in the United States
December sporting events
Mile races
Beer culture
Sports in Austin, Texas
Novelty running